Harston is a small town in Victoria, Australia. It is located in the City of Greater Shepparton.

References

External links

Towns in Victoria (Australia)
City of Greater Shepparton